The Chronicle was a free weekly newspaper in Canberra, Australia. It was published by Australian Community Media from the Fyshwick headquarters of The Canberra Times and was funded through advertising. Its suspension of print publication was announced on 8 April 2020 by unrelated publication City News.

Background 
The Canberra Chronicle was announced as a 'new newspaper for Canberra' in August 1981, with the first issue available on 16 September that year. It was described as a free weekly suburban newspaper covering the local scene and complementing The Canberra Times through its same publisher, The Federal Capital Press of Australia Pty Ltd. Initially it had an editorial team of three people including Graham Cooke, but it has also been said to have started with only one staff member (separate to the Times). Founding editor Garry Raffaele has described the team as six advertising staff and an editor, and borrowing Times staff on Fridays. There was an original print run of 75,200, which by its tenth anniversary in September 1991, increased to more than 90,000 copies. The Chronicle, alongside the Times, moved headquarters from Braddon to a new building in Fyshwick in April 1987.

In 1988, the Chronicle was cleared by the Australian Press Council of a bias allegation regarding election candidate coverage.

The paper, alongside The Canberra Times, was sold by John Fairfax Ltd to Kerry Stokes in 1989.

In 2014, the Queanbeyan City Council proposed withdrawing advertising funds from The Chronicle and other local papers, in lieu of publishing their own newsletter-style newspaper. The plan for a council-run paper was debated and did not win majority support and undertook no further action.

In the issue of Tuesday 7 April 2020, the front page stated that it would not be published the following fortnights (14 April and 21 April) due to a short recess. It was planned that the next issue would be published on 28 April, but this did not occur. The Chronicle's planned publication suspension was covered in the unrelated City News, and was not published thereafter, making it the final issue.

Title history 
The Chronicle split into Northside Chronicle and Southside Chronicle, then later added City Chronicle and Queanbeyan Chronicle. The Gungahlin Chronicle was added in 1995. Other title iterations included Belconnen Chronicle and the Tuggeranong Chronicle. The Tuggeranong Chronicle was previously known as the Weston Creek-Woden Valley View, Valley View and the Valley Chronicle. The Northside and Southside issues began in January 1990. These local versions including City Chronicle were merged into the main title in July 2014.

 Canberra Chronicle, Vol. 1, no. 1 (16 September 1981) - Vol. 7, no. 318 (5 July 1988).
 The Chronicle (sometimes listed as Chronicle (Canberra, ACT)), Vol. 7, no. 319 (12 July 1988) - Vol. 8, no. 378 (19 December 1989)
 Northside Chronicle, Vol. 8, no. 379 (23 January 1990) - (29 July 2014)
 Southside Chronicle, Vol. 8, no 379 (23 January 1990) - (29 July 2014)
 The Chronicle, Vol. 19, no. 31 (5 August 2014) - (7 April 2020)

References

External links 

 Digital edition (requires free registration, full as-printed coverage 3 July 2018 - 7 April 2020, final issue)
 Publication information from Australian Community Media AdCentre

Newspapers published in Australian Capital Territory
1981 establishments in Australia
2020 disestablishments in Australia
Weekly newspapers published in Australia